Ongan, also called Angan, South Andamanese or Jarawa–Onge, is a phylum of two Andamanese languages, Önge and Jarawa, spoken in the southern Andaman Islands.

The two known extant languages are:

Önge or Onge ( transcribes ); 96 speakers (Onge) in 1997, mostly monolingual
Jarawa or Järawa; estimated at 200 speakers (Jarawa) in 1997, monolingual
A third language, Sentinelese, the presumed language of the Sentinelese people, is commonly presumed to be an Ongan language but in fact is completely unknown by non-Sentinelese people; estimated 15–500 speakers.
A fourth language, Jangil, extinct sometime between 1895 and 1920, is reported to have been unintelligible with but to have had noticeable similarities to Jarawa.

External relationships
The Andamanese languages fall into two clear families, Great Andamanese and Ongan, plus one presumed but unattested language, Sentinelese. The similarities between Great Andamanese and Ongan are mainly of a typological and morphological nature, with little demonstrated common vocabulary. Linguists, including long-range researchers such as Joseph Greenberg, have expressed doubts as to the validity of Andamanese as a family.

It has since been proposed (by Juliette Blevins 2007) that Ongan (but not Great Andamanese) is distantly related to Austronesian in a family called Austronesian–Ongan. 
However, the proposal of a genealogical connection between Austronesian and Ongan has not been well-received by other linguists.  George Van Driem (2011) considers Blevins' evidence as "not compelling", although he leaves the possibility open that some resemblances could be the result of contact/borrowing, a position also held by Hoogervorst (2012). Robert Blust (2014) argues that Blevins' conclusions are not supported by her data, and that of her first 25 reconstructions, none are reproducible using the comparative method. Blust concludes that the grammatical comparison does not hold up, and also cites non-linguistic (such as cultural, archaeological, and biological) evidence against Blevins' hypothesis.

Reconstruction

The two attested Ongan languages are relatively close, and the historical sound reconstruction mostly straightforward:

*ə appears to be allophonic for *e before a nasal coda.

Grammar

The Ongan languages are agglutinative, with an extensive prefix and suffix system.  They have a noun class system based largely on body parts, in which every noun and adjective may take a prefix according to which body part it is associated with (on the basis of shape, or functional association). Another peculiarity of terms for body parts is that they are inalienably possessed, requiring a possessive adjective prefix to complete them, so one cannot say "head" alone, but only "my, or his, or your, etc. head".

The Ongan pronouns are here represented by Önge:

There is also an indefinite prefix ən-, on- "someone's". Jarawa does not have the plural series, but the singular is very close: m-, ŋ- or n-, w-, ən-. From this, Blevins reconstructs Proto-Ongan *m-, *ŋ-, *gw-, *en-.

Judging from the available sources, the Andamanese languages have only two cardinal numbers: one and two and their entire numerical lexicon is one, two, one more, some more, and all.

See also
List of Proto-Ongan reconstructions (Wiktionary)

References

Further reading
 Das Gupta, D. and S. R. Sharma.  A Handbook of the Önge Language. Anthropological Survey of India: Calcutta 1982.
 E. H. Man, Dictionary of the South Andaman Language, British India Press: Bombay 1923.
 Senkuttuvan, R. 2000. The Language of the Jarawa: Phonology. Calcutta: Anthropological Survey of India, Government of India, Ministry of Culture, Youth Affairs, and Sports, Dept. of Culture.
 Sreenathan, M. 2001. Jarwa - Language and Culture. Anthropological Survey of India, Ministry of Culture, Government of India, Kolkata

External links
Freelang Onge Dictionary

 
Agglutinative languages

Endangered languages
Language families